John Herbert Green (9 May 1908 – 13 September 1987) was an English cricketer.  Green was a right-handed batsman who bowled slow left-arm orthodox.  He was born at Kenilworth, Warwickshire, and was educated at Brighton College.

Green made a single first-class appearance for Warwickshire against Worcestershire at the New Road, Worcester, in the 1927 County Championship.  Warwickshire won the toss and elected to bat, making 216 all out in their first-innings, with Green ending the innings not out without scoring.  Worcestershire responded in their first-innings with 289 all out, with Green bowling four wicketless overs.  Warwickshire reached 139/3 in their second-innings, with the match declared a draw.  This was his only major appearance for Warwickshire.

He died at Hove, Sussex, on 13 September 1987.

References

External links
John Green at ESPNcricinfo
John Green at CricketArchive

1908 births
1987 deaths
People from Kenilworth
People educated at Brighton College
English cricketers
Warwickshire cricketers